Retromammary space is a loose areolar tissue that separates the breast from the pectoralis major muscle. The retromammary space is often the site of breast implantation due to its location away from key nerves and structures that support the breast.

References 

Breast anatomy